

Births and deaths

Births
 Phil Tanner (1862–1950)
 Stan Hugill (1906–1992)
 A.L. Lloyd (1908–1982)
 Copper Family (c. 1912 – 1915)
 Phoebe Smith (1913)
 Walter Pardon (1914–1996)
 Ewan MacColl (1915–1989)
 Fred Jordan (1922–2002)
 Shirley Collins (1935)
 Martin Carthy (1941)
 Dave Swarbrick (1941)
 Bert Jansch (1943)
 Peter Bellamy (1944–1991)
 Ralph McTell (1944)
 John Renbourn (1944)
 Ashley Hutchings (1945)
 June Tabor (1947)
 Maddy Prior (1947)
 Sandy Denny (1947–1978)
 Richard Thompson (1949)

Collections of songs or music
 1905: Songs of the West (2nd ed) by Sabine Baring-Gould (1834–1924)
 1907: English Folk Song: Some Conclusions by Cecil Sharp (1859–1924)	
 1908: Traditional English Songs by Lucy Broadwood (1858–1929)
 1913: The Morris Book by Cecil Sharp
 1913: Sword Dances of Northern England by Cecil Sharp 
 1919: English Folk Songs From the Southern Appalachian by Cecil Sharp
 1922: The Country Dance Book by Cecil Sharp
 1923: Folk Songs of the Upper Thames by Alfred Williams
 1924: The Dance by Cecil Sharp

Early recordings
The dates of early commercial recordings, and the modern reissue albums on which they can be heard
 1908: Scott Skinner (1843–1927) The Music Of Scott Skinner
 1908: Joseph Taylor (1832 – c. 1908) Unto Brigg Fair 
 1937: Phil Tanner (1862–1950) The Gower Nightingale

English folk music by date
Folk
Folk
20th century in British television